Paul Litjens (born 11 September 1947, Loon op Zand) is a former field hockey player for the Netherlands. He played 177 matches with the Dutch national team, scoring 268 goals, an international record he held from 1982 to 2004.

Career
Litjens played for hockey clubs in Uden and Zaanstad before joining HC Kampong of Utrecht. He was a member of the Dutch team that became World Champion in 1973 and participated in the 1972 and 1976 Summer Olympics. In both these Olympics, the Dutch team took a frustrating fourth place. In 1981 Litjens and the Dutch team won the Champions Trophy in Karachi.

Litjens specialized in the penalty corner and was a prolific goal scorer. He was the top scorer in the Olympic Games of 1976 and at the 1981 Champions Trophy.

Brand Ambassador
Litjens was the Brand Ambassador of Rucanor. He appeared in the poster for its Karachi King Super hockey stick.

See also 
List of men's field hockey players with 100 or more international goals

References

External links
 

1947 births
Living people
Dutch male field hockey players
Olympic field hockey players of the Netherlands
Field hockey players at the 1972 Summer Olympics
Field hockey players at the 1976 Summer Olympics
People from Loon op Zand
SV Kampong players
1978 Men's Hockey World Cup players
Sportspeople from North Brabant